Marc Lacroix (1927–2007) was a French photographer.

1927 births
2007 deaths
French photographers
Portrait photographers